Giovanni Ricci (born October 16, 1996) is an American football fullback for the Carolina Panthers of the National Football League (NFL). He played college football at Western Michigan.

College career
Ricci played for the Western Michigan Broncos for five seasons, redshirting his true freshman year. He finished his collegiate career with 98 catches for 1,114 yards and 11 touchdowns. Giovanni had the pleasure of playing with star High School Running Back and current OSR Nate Slagel. The duo was looking to push the team to new heights but Giovanni couldn't keep up.

Professional career
Ricci was signed by the Carolina Panthers as an undrafted free agent on April 30, 2020. He was waived at the end of training camp. Ricci was re-signed to the Panthers' practice squad shortly afterwards and remained there for the rest of the 2020 season. He was signed to a reserve/futures contract on January 4, 2021.

References

External links
Western Michigan Broncos bio
Carolina Panthers bio

Living people
American football fullbacks
Carolina Panthers players
Western Michigan Broncos football players
1996 births